is a 1995 Japanese animated science fiction drama film which premiered on March 4, 1995, in Japan, based on the 15th volume of the same name of the Doraemon Long Stories series. It is the 16th Doraemon film.

Plot

Nobita was reading a picture book in which he saw Adam and Eve disobeying God and eating the forbidden fruit in the garden of Eden. He commented that their descendants have to face many difficulties because of Adam and Eve's mistake. Then Doraemon reminded Nobita that he had to do his summer vacation research homework. Nobita decided to see his friends' research homework, only to be discouraged to see how all of them were having something to do.

Upon going to the future to view his completed homework, Nobita received a package of World Creation set ordered by Doraemon to help him with his work. Thus, Nobita started creating a new Solar System using "elements of the universe" dust and describe the process on the observatory diary. Nobita did encounter some problems, including being beaten by Gian for outrunning him with the homework after Gian and Suneo's mutual project for their homework failed, and letting his artificial sun devour the other planets due to Nobita's forgetfulness. Doraemon reversed the time, and they saved the project and got to see how Earth settles to have life, from tiny cells to fish-like organisms. Doraemon took Nobita to his universe. To speed up the process, Doraemon caught the ancestor of land vertebrates, a Eusthenopteron, and uses the Evolution-Devolution Beam on it to evolve it though there was a small bug disrupting Nobita. That night Gian decided to meet and apologize to Nobita and persuade him for a position on the project, but caught a strange falling star. He followed it and saw two humanoid mantis-like creatures talking. The creatures saw Gian and chase him but retreated when the time patrol came in their way; all was perceived as a sleepwalk by Gian. The next day, the first fish to ever walk on land had been seen, and soon followed by the ruling of the dinosaurs, which brought so much joy for Doraemon and Nobita. But soon, an asteroid hit the Earth, which caused the dinosaurs to perish. Nobita went devastated, but Doraemon comforted him.
Gian, Suneo, and Shizuka joined the project. All of them entered Nobita's universe, where they got to see the earth during the Ice Age from which not only they made a satisfying record about the people, animal, lifestyle after helping a group of primitive kids who look like Nobita, Suneo and Gian find their way home, but also set the first step in superstition since Nobita presented with the kids, gave them the tool and called himself Kami. That day Gian ostentatiously revealed the project with two other friends, which caught the attention of the mantis-like creatures.
 
The next day, only Doraemon, Nobita, and Shizuka visited the universe, where they saw a sign of civilization, but in the early  stage as shown with poor agriculture, witch doctor, and habit of human sacrifice. They also met the presumably descendants of the primitive kids, now in a different class, and encountered a mysterious giant two-head centipede-like monster. When the trio come back home to record their progress, Nobita had a strange pain in his butt caused by an unusually tiny arrow. Suneo and Gian decided to cancel their part in the project to have a vacation, which enraged the others. The duo was then kidnapped by the mantis creatures that Gian had caught sight of previously. The next day, Doraemon and Shizuka wandered off to other countries, while Nobita headed to Japan and followed his look-alike named Nobina, a herb merchandiser, who is treated badly by Suneo's look-a-like, a royal doctor named Sunemaro. Nobina, on the way home, rescued and took care of an injured beetle-like creature whom he calls Chunko. When Nobina's wife found out and kicked Chunko out of their house, Nobina went searching and reunited with her when a couple guided him through a cave to an exotic kingdom, where Nobina was treated well and rewarded with a huge amount of treasure, ending his long-lasting suffer in poverty. The daughter of Sunemaro then vanished, starting a vigorous searching as people suspected she was caught by an evil supernatural force. The couple, now revealing themself to be insect-like citizens, summoned a demonic entity to scare the people away, which is also later shown to be a gathering of thousands of insect people. Fortunately, the daughter is found oversleeping by a tree.

The trio, after traveling through many different cultures, had noticed the existence of tiny pixie creatures and stories of an underworld land coincidentally shared among ages and countries. The next day, the group traveled to Japan in the likely Taishō era and followed the air balloon led by Dr. Dekimatsu, Mr. President Nobihide and his secretary Shizuyo, the contemporary versions of Dekisugi, Nobita, and Shizuka respectively, to a newly found giant hole in the South Pole. The crew was stopped by the figure of a god-like man, through which Doraemon looked to be another gathering of tiny insect people. He disintegrated them using his gadget, helping the crew to go on.

They arrive at the hole and enter it to reach at a different underground world where insect mantis inhabits Nobihide go for negotiate with the insect mantis king and king reveals that they are going to capture the upper world. While Nobita and friends meet Gian and Suneo with an insect boy, he also have a robot like Doraemon. The boy says that he was trying to know about evolution of sea animals to land living animals actually Nobita was the cause of it. So the insect reaches there city. This time the insect mantis was ready to attack the nobihide and the airship. Doraemon appears and says that nobita is the creator of the world and the also creates a new world for the insects mantis thus saves the humans. And then, Nobita completes the diary on his own.

Cast

Release
This film was released on 4 March 1995.

Soundtrack
Opening Song: Doraemon No Uta

Title Track and Ending Song: Sayounara ni Sayounara

References

External links 
 Doraemon The Movie 25th page 
 

Nobita's Genesis Diary
1995 films
1995 anime films
Films directed by Tsutomu Shibayama
Animated films about insects
Films scored by Shunsuke Kikuchi
Japanese children's fantasy films